Frank Townsend may refer to:

 Frank Townsend (cricketer, born 1847), cricketer born 1847
 Frank Townsend (cricketer, born 1875), cricketer born 1875
 Frank Townsend (rugby league) (1925–1946), English rugby league footballer who played in the 1940s
 Frank Townsend (wrestler) (1933–1965), American professional wrestler